Marios Karas (born October 24, 1974) is a Cypriot retired football defender. He last played for Agia Napa after many years at Enosis Neon Paralimni. 
He was appointed as assistant manager at Enosis Neon Paralimni in 2012 after retiring as a player and currently serves as caretaker manager.

External links
 

Living people
1974 births
Enosis Neon Paralimni FC players
Cypriot footballers
Cyprus international footballers
Cypriot First Division players
Association football defenders
Ayia Napa FC managers